McMullen is a surname. 

McMullen may also refer to:

Places

United States
 McMullen, Alabama
 McMullen, Virginia 
 McMullen County, Texas

See also 
McMullens, a British regional brewery in Hertford